Madisetti Anant Ramlu (born 1927) served as the founder and first Head of the Department of Mining Engineering at the Indian Institute of Technology (IIT) in Kharagpur, India, from 1958 until 1987, when he retired as the Deputy Director & Acting Director of IIT. He is an expert in the area of mines safety, machinery, and open-cast mining. He received his BS in Mining & Metallurgy from the Banaras Hindu University (BHU) and his PhD in Mining Engineering from Germany (Bergakadamie Clausthal).

Dr. M. A. Ramlu is married to Saroja, and has two sons - Dr. Vijay K. Madisetti of Georgia Institute of Technology and Dr. Avanindra Madisetti of Mobius Semiconductors in Irvine, California.
Prof. Madisetti A. Ramlu was recently awarded the 2009 S. K. Bose Memorial Teaching Excellence Award by the Mining, Geological, and Metallurgical Institute (MGMI) of India.

Publications
 Madisetti Anant Ramlu (1956). Ablagerung von feinem Kohlenstaub in einem Staubversuchsraum unter Tage. Clausthal, Bergak., F. f. Bergbau u. Hüttenw., Diss. v. 16. Juli 1956 (Nur in beschr. Anz. f. d. Aust.).

References

Academic staff of IIT Kharagpur
Possibly living people
1927 births